Easton Michael McGee (born December 26, 1997) is an American professional baseball pitcher for the Seattle Mariners of Major League Baseball (MLB). He made his Major League Baseball (MLB) debut with the Tampa Bay Rays in 2022.

Career

Tampa Bay Rays
McGee played high school baseball for Hopkinsville High School in his hometown of Hopkinsville, Kentucky. He committed to play college baseball for the Kentucky Wildcats, but was selected by the Tampa Bay Rays in the fourth round of the 2016 MLB draft. He made his professional debut that season with the rookie-level Gulf Coast League Rays, then spent 2017 with the Princeton Rays of the Appalachian League. McGee advanced to Class A Short Season in 2018 with the Hudson Valley Renegades, then Class A in 2019 with the Bowling Green Hot Rods. After the 2020 minor-league season was canceled, McGee split the 2021 season between Double-A with the Montgomery Biscuits and Triple-A with the Durham Bulls.

McGee returned to Durham for the 2022 season, pitching to a 6–9 record with a 5.43 earned run average (ERA) in 27 games (22 starts). He made his major-league debut with the Rays on October 2, pitching three innings while allowing one unearned run on four hits. The following day, McGee was designated for assignment.

Seattle Mariners
On October 5, 2022, McGee was claimed off waivers by the Boston Red Sox. On November 9, McGee was acquired by the Seattle Mariners in exchange for cash considerations. McGee was optioned to the Triple-A Tacoma Rainiers to begin the 2023 season.

References

External links

1997 births
Living people
Baseball players from Kentucky
Bowling Green Hot Rods players
Durham Bulls players
Gulf Coast Rays players
Hudson Valley Renegades players
Major League Baseball pitchers
Montgomery Biscuits players
People from Hopkinsville, Kentucky
Princeton Rays players
Tampa Bay Rays players